Sexi may refer to:

 Sexi (Phoenician colony)
 SNOBOL was originally called SEXI